Ed Kavanagh is a Canadian writer residing in Mount Pearl, Newfoundland. He is also a musician, theatre director, actor, and university lecturer. His first novel, The confessions of Nipper Mooney, won the 2002 Newfoundland Book Award.

Life 
Kavanagh was born in St. John's, Newfoundland and grew up in Kilbride, Newfoundland. He received an Honours Bachelor of Arts in English and a Bachelor of Education from the Memorial University of Newfoundland. He also received a Master's in English and Creative Writing from the University of New Brunswick. 

Kavanagh is a harpist and has released three CDs, including "On Strings of Light: Christmas Melodies Performed on Celtic Harp", "One Star Awake", and "Weaving the Wind". Kavanagh has taught creative writing through the Memorial University and the University of New Brunswick. He was also a former president of the Writer's Alliance of Newfoundland and Labrador.

Works 

 The Cat's Meow - The 'Longside Players Selected Plays: 1984-1989 (1990)
 The Confessions of Nipper Mooney (2001)
 Amanda Greenleaf: The Complete Adventures (2004)
 Strays (2013)

Awards 

 2002 Newfoundland Book Award for The Confessions of Nipper Mooney
 Finalist for the Winterset Award for The Confessions of Nipper Mooney
 Nominated for the International IMPAC Dublin Literary Award for The Confessions of Nipper Mooney
 Shortlisted for the Newfoundland Book Award for Fiction for Strays
 Shortlisted for the Thomas Raddall Atlantic Fiction Award for Strays

References 

Living people
Canadian male novelists
People from Mount Pearl
21st-century Canadian novelists
Year of birth missing (living people)